Grow is the debut studio album by American progressive rock band Chon. It was released on March 23, 2015, through Sumerian Records. It was the band's last release to feature bassist Drew Pelisek.

Track listing
Adapted from iTunes

Personnel
Chon
 Mario Camarena – guitar, bass guitar, keyboard, piano
 Erick Hansel – guitar, bass, piano
 Drew Pelisek – bass guitar, vocals
 Nathan Camarena – drums, percussion, vocals

Guest Musicians
 Brian Evans – drums (Tracks: 2, 9, 10)
 Matt Garstka – drums (Tracks: 4, 12)

Production
 Eric Palmquist – tracking, recording, audio engineering
 Shaun Lopez – mixing
 Eric Broyhill – mastering
 Andrew Jarrín – management
 Amanda Fiore and Daniel McBride – A&R
 Daniel McBride – photography, artwork, layout
 Mario Camarena and Erick Hansel – additional art
 Steven Conteras – additional photography

Chart performance

References

2015 debut albums
Chon (band) albums
Sumerian Records albums